Haynes is a town in Lee County, Arkansas, United States. The population was 150 at the 2010 census, down from 214 at the 2000 census.

Geography
Haynes is located in northern Lee County at  (34.889993, -90.793472). Arkansas Highway 1 passes through the town, leading south  to Marianna, the county seat, and north the same distance to Forrest City.

Demographics

As of the census of 2000, there were 214 people, 71 households, and 51 families residing in the town.  The population density was 223.3/km2 (582.0/mi2).  There were 74 housing units at an average density of 77.2/km2 (201.3/mi2).  The racial makeup of the town was 14.95% White and 85.05% Black or African American.

There were 71 households, out of which 31.0% had children under the age of 18 living with them, 50.7% were married couples living together, 12.7% had a female householder with no husband present, and 26.8% were non-families. 23.9% of all households were made up of individuals, and 14.1% had someone living alone who was 65 years of age or older.  The average household size was 3.01 and the average family size was 3.60.

In the town, the population was spread out, with 36.4% under the age of 18, 4.7% from 18 to 24, 21.5% from 25 to 44, 22.4% from 45 to 64, and 15.0% who were 65 years of age or older.  The median age was 36 years. For every 100 females, there were 89.4 males.  For every 100 females age 18 and over, there were 97.1 males.

The median income for a household in the town was $19,583, and the median income for a family was $21,250. Males had a median income of $22,188 versus $20,000 for females. The per capita income for the town was $8,057.  About 30.0% of families and 42.1% of the population were below the poverty line, including 54.4% of those under the age of eighteen and 50.0% of those 65 or over.

Education
It is in the Lee County School District, based in Marianna. The local high school is Lee High School.

In 1965 the Haynes School District merged into the Marianna School District.

References

Towns in Lee County, Arkansas
Towns in Arkansas